Covers is a compilation album by The Smithereens, released in May 2018 by Sunset Blvd Records. It was originally released as a digital download on iTunes in May 2014. The album features 22 cover songs recorded by the band between 1980 and 2008. Most of the songs have previously been released as b-sides or on tribute albums and soundtracks.

Background 

Covers features songs that are collected from different sessions throughout the band's career. Guitarist Jim Babjak: “Whenever we had extra time in the studio we’d knock off covers for fun."

Critical reception 

Jeff Elbel of the Illinois Entertainer rated the album 7 stars out of 10, stating: "If these songs represent the Smithereens' schoolbooks, Covers is the thesis supporting the band's tenured status as professors and proclaimers of perfect power pop."

Track listing 

Notes
"The Game of Love", "Yer Blues", "Rosie Won't You Please Come Home" and "The Stroll" were recorded in 1993-1994 during sessions for A Date with The Smithereens. They were previously released on The Mega-Box Set, an unofficial 21-CD box set released in 2005 through Pat DiNizio's website in a  limited edition of 500 copies. "The Stroll" was originally featured in Reform School Girl, an episode in the 1994 Showtime television series Rebel Highway. 

"Ruler of My Heart", "One After 909", "Somethin' Stupid" and "Lust For Life" were recorded in December 1987 during sessions for Green Thoughts.

"Let's Talk About Us" was recorded in 1993 for Brace Yourself! A Tribute to Otis Blackwell.  

"Time Won't Let Me" was recorded in June 1994 for the film Timecop but not included on the soundtrack album. 

"I Want to Tell You" was recorded in 2002 for Songs from the Material World: A Tribute to George Harrison.

"It Don't Come Easy", "The World Keeps Going 'Round" and "Shakin' All Over" were recorded spring 1991 during sessions for Blow Up.

"Downbound Train" was recorded 24 January 1997 for One Step Up/Two Steps Back: The Songs of Bruce Springsteen.

"The Seeker" was recorded spring 1987.

Personnel 
Adapted from the liner notes of Covers and Attack of The Smithereens, except where noted.
The Smithereens
Pat DiNizio – lead and backing vocals, guitar, harmonica
Jim Babjak – guitar, backing vocals, lead vocals on "Rosie Won't You Please Come Home" and "The World Keeps Going 'Round", co-lead vocal on "One After 909"  
Dennis Diken – drums, percussion, backing vocals
Mike Mesaros – bass, backing vocals 
Severo "The Thrilla" Jornacion – bass on "Well...Alright"
Additional musicians
Don Dixon – piano on "Ruler of My Heart" 
Michael Hamilton – keyboards on "Wooly Bully" 
Kenny Margolis – piano, backing vocals, hand claps on "Let's Talk About Us", piano on "One After 909" and "It Don't Come Easy"   
Ira Sebastian Elliott – hand claps on "Let's Talk About Us"
Tony Visconti – backing vocals on "Let's Talk About Us"
Jimmy Wood –  harmonica on "Time Won't Let Me"  
Ron Fair – organ on "Time Won't Let Me" 
Dave Amels – piano on "I Want to Tell You"
Bill Maryniak – organ on "Downbound Train" 
Marti Jones – co-lead vocal on "Somethin' Stupid" 

Technical
The Smithereens – production on "Wooly Bully", "Girl Don't Tell Me", "Time Won't Let Me", "It Don't Come Easy", "The World Keeps Going 'Round", "The Seeker" and "Shakin' All Over", compilation producer  
Don Dixon – production on "Ruler of My Heart", "One After 909", "Somethin' Stupid" and "Lust For Life" 
Ralph Sall – production on  "Wooly Bully" 
Peter McCabe – production assistance on  "Wooly Bully" 
Jon Tiven – production on "Let's Talk About Us"
Tony Visconti – production on "Let's Talk About Us"
Ron Fair – production on "Time Won't Let Me"
Bennett Kaufman – production on "Time Won't Let Me"
Don Fleming – production on "Gloomy Sunday"
Michael Hamilton]] – production on "It Don't Come Easy" and "The World Keeps Going 'Round"
Pat DiNizio – production on "Well...Alright"
Jim Babjak – production on "Well...Alright"
Dennis Diken – production on "Well...Alright"
Kurt Reil – production on "Well...Alright"  
Mike Mesaros – production on "Downbound Train" 
Ed Stasium – production on "Shakin' All Over"  
Todd Sinclair – compilation supervisor
Rebecca Baltutis – album design
Bob Gramegna – photo restoration

References 

The Smithereens albums
2018 compilation albums
Covers albums